Kevin Crawford (born in Birmingham, England) is an Irish flute, tin whistle, low whistle and bodhrán player. He was born in England to Irish parents from Milltown Malbay, County Clare. He later moved to West Clare to improve his music and become more exposed to traditional Irish music.

Bands
He started in the late 1980s with English band Long Acre working with artists such as Mick Conneely, Brendan Boyle, Bernadette Davis, Joe Molloy and Ivan Miletitch. After recording and co-producing what he described as his most "traditional" CD with "Grianán," a group including Siobhán and Tommy Peoples, Niamh de Búrca, P.J. King, Martin Murray, Paul McSherry, John Maloney, and Pat Marsh (released in 1993), Crawford joined Moving Cloud in 1993, with whom he recorded two albums.

He joined one of Ireland's top traditional bands, Lúnasa, in 1997, replacing Michael McGoldrick. Crawford became the frontman for Lúnasa during their live performances. With the band he has recorded a number of albums, while he has also recorded solo albums and albums with other musicians.

He also tours with Martin Hayes and John Doyle as The Teetotallers.

According to the liner notes in Carrying the Tune, he plays "Mike Grinter flutes and whistles and Susato, Generation and Jonathan Sindt whistles."

Discography
Solo
 'D' Flute Album (1995)
 In Good Company (2001)
 A Breath of Fresh Air (2007)
 Carrying the Tune (2012)

with Grianán
 The Maid of Eirin (1993)

with Raise The Rafters
 Raise The Rafters (1995)

with Moving Cloud
 Moving Cloud (1995)
 Foxglove (1998)

with Lúnasa
 Otherworld (1999)
 The Merry Sisters of Fate (2001)
 Redwood (2003)
 The Kinnitty Sessions (2004)
 Sé (2006)
 The Story So Far ... (2008)
 The Leitrim Equation featuring Lúnasa (2009) (features Lúnasa and other Irish musicians)
 Lá Nua (2010)
 CAS (2018)

with Cillian Vallely
 On Common Ground (2009)

with The Drunken Gaugers 
 The Drunken Gaugers: Kevin Crawford, Dylan Foley (fiddle), and Patrick Doocey (guitar) (2017)

with Colin Farrell & Patrick Doocey
 Music and Mischief (2019)

References

External links

 Kevin Crawford's page at Compass Records
Lúnasa website

1967 births
Living people
Bodhrán players
British flautists
English people of Irish descent
Green Linnet Records artists
Lúnasa (band) members
People from Birmingham, West Midlands
Tin whistle players